Lithodraba is a genus of flowering plants belonging to the family Brassicaceae.

Its native range is Argentina.

Species:
 Lithodraba mendocinensis (Hauman) Boelcke

References

Brassicaceae
Brassicaceae genera